Georgy Toloraya (April 3, 1956) - Russian diplomat, Director of department at “Russkiy Mir” Presidential foundation, Executive Director of Russian National Committee on BRICS research, the East Asia section Director at the Institute of Economics of the Russian Academy of Sciences, Visiting professor at the Moscow State Institute of International Relations (MGIMO).

Biography 
Prof. Georgy Toloraya is a professional diplomat (rank of Minister) with decades-long experience in Asian affairs, having served two postings in North Korea (1977–80 and 1984-7), then in South Korea as a Deputy chief of the Russian Embassy (1993-8) and later as the senior Russian Foreign Ministry official (Deputy director-general) in charge of the Korean Peninsula (1998–2003). He later worked as the Consul General of Russia in Sydney, Australia (2003–2007). Prior to that he worked for trade promotion agencies related to Asia.. Prof. Toloraya pursued a successful scholarly career, having graduated from MGIMO (Moscow University of International Relations) in 1978, earning a PhD in 1984, Doctor of Economy degree in 1994 and a Full Professor degree in Oriental studies in 2002. He has published many articles and books on East Asia, collaborated as a part-time researcher with noted Russian academic institutes including the Institute of World Economy and International Relations (IMEMO), and teaches Asian politics at MGIMO. In 2007-2008 he was a visiting fellow at the Brookings Institution in Washington, DC.

Education 
M.A. - Moscow Institute of International Relations, Majoring in International Economic Relations, 1973-1978

Ph.D. in Economics - Graduate School of the Institute of Economics of the World Socialist System (IEWSS), 1981-1984

Doctor of Economy - Academy of Science of Russian Federation, 1994

Full Professor-	Ministry of Education of Russia, 2003

Work experience 
2003-2007 - 	Consul-General of Russian Federation in Sydney, The Commonwealth of Australia

1998-2003 -	Deputy Director-General, First Asian Department, Ministry of Foreign Affairs of Russia

1993-1998 -	Minister-Counselor, Deputy Chief of Mission, Russian Embassy in Republic of Korea, Seoul

1991-1993 -	Director, Korean Division, Russian Ministry of Foreign Affairs

1990-1991 -	Executive Secretary, USSR-Republic of Korea Economic Cooperation Council, USSR Chamber of Commerce and Industry

1987-1990 - 	Senior Researcher, Institute of Economics of the World Socialist System (IEWSS), USSR Academy of Science

1984-1987 - 	Economist - Representative of IEWSS, USSR Trade Representation in DPR Korea, Pyongyang

1980-1984 - 	Researcher, IEWSS

1978-1980 -	Staff Member, USSR Trade Representation in Democratic People's Republic of Korea, Pyongyang

Teaching and research experience 
2003–present - Founder and Research Director of Center of Contemporary Korean Studies, IMEMO, (Russian Institute of Global Economy and International Relations) Moscow, Leading research fellow of IMEMO (since 1998)

1981-1982, 1987–1989, 1998–2003 - Visiting professor, Moscow State Institute (University) of International Relations (MGIMO) (part-time)

1988–present - Dissertation Adviser for 2 PhD dissertations Dissertation Evaluation Discussant for appr.10 dissertations

2007–present - Chief Research Fellow, Institute of Economics, Russian Academy of Science (part-time)

Major publications 
More than 150 articles in Russian and international periodicals and academic journals published in Russia, USA, Republic of Korea, Hong-Kong, Japanp, EU etc.

 Social-economic strategy and economic situation of Indochina and DPR Korea: Western estimates - Moscow, 1983, IEWSS publishers, 86 pp.
 DPR Korea Economic Complex - Moscow, 1984, IEWSS publishers, 162 pp.
 Chapter «Economic policy» in «Democratic Peoples Republic of Korea. Policy and Economy» - Moscow, «Nauka» publishers, 1985.
 The World Map Series: DPR Korea (together with I.Bolshov) - Moscow, 1987, «Mysl» publishers, 133 pp.
 Foreign Economic Cooperation Strategy: DPR Korea's Economists’ Views. - Moscow, IEWSS publishers, 1988, 35 pp.
 The World Map Series: Republic of Korea - Moscow, 1991, «Mysl» publishers, 120 pp.
 Our Business Partners: Republic of Korea - Moscow, «International Relations» publishers (together with G.Voitolovsky, S.Diykov), 1991, 190 pp.
 Abstracts of ROK economy (together with M.Trigubenko) - «Nauka» publishers, Moscow, 1993 - 156 pp.
 Chapter: «Moscow and North Korea; the 1961 Treaty and After» in: «Russia in the East and Pacific Region», Seoul, 1994.
 Chapter «ROK: Market Creation Experience» in «Modern Civilized Market» - Moscow, 1995.
 Chapter: «Cultural Context of Globalisation Policy» - in. «ROK: Creation of Modern Society» - IMEMO/Korea Foundation, Moscow/Seoul, 1996.
 Chapter: «Crisis Prevention in Korea». -in: «Japan and Russia in Northeast Asia», Praeger, London, 1999
 Chapter: «Liberalization of Foreign Economic Relations in Korea: a Remedy or a Poison?» - in: «Korea in 1990-s: a new stage of Reforms» - IMEMO/Korea Foundation, Moscow/Seoul, 1999.
 Chapters: “Russia –South Korea, North Korea, Mongolia - In Search of Cooperation Model”-in: The Northeast Asia Trade, Investment and Technology Cooperation: Russian Perspective – IMEMO/Korea Foundation, Moscow/Seoul, 2000.
 Chapter: Korean Peninsula in the Regional Sub-system of International Relations: End of 20th – Beginning of 21st Century- In: Asia and the Pacific and Central Asia: the Contours of Security - MGIMO press, Moscow, 2002
 Political Systems of Two Korean States – MGIMO press, 2002, 120 pp.
 Chapter: Russia and North Korea – Ten Years Later. – In: The Future of North Korea / Ed.Tsuneo Akaha - L & NY, Routledge, 2002
 President Putin's Korea Policy- The Journal of East Asian Studies, Seoul, vol.17, N 1, 2003.
 Fifty years without War and without Peace-Moscow, IMEMO press, 2003-
 Editor.
 The Nucleus of the Problem. The Ways of Overcoming the Crisis on theKorean Peninsula.(together with A.Vorontsov, V.Novikov)- Moscow Carnegie Center, 2003, 22 pp.
 Overcoming the Korean Crisis: Short- and Long-Term Options and Implications by a Russian Perspective-International Journal of Korean Unification Studies, vol.12, N 2, 2003
 Chapter:In Search of a Solution to Korean Crisis: Regime Change or Regime Transformation –The North Korean Crisis and Beyond, Wellington, 2004
 Korean Peninsula: Russian Priorities (together with A.Vorontsov) –Russian Analytica, Moscow, Vol.3, Dec.2004.
 Chapter: “Russian Experience in Information Technology Cooperation with Two Koreas”.- Bytes and Bullets/Ed.by A.Mansourov, Honolulu, 2005
 Chapter: “Korean Security Dilemmas: a Russian Prospective. In: Hazel Smith (ed) Reconstituting Korean Security” (Tokyo: United Nations University, 2007).
 Chapter; “North Korea- an Experiment in Nuclear Prolifiration” (together with A.Vorontsov)- In: At the Nuclear Threshold/Ed. By Alexei Arbatov- Moscow, Carnegie Moscow Center, 2007

Professional activity 
Participation in conferences and seminars in Russia, USA, China, Republic of Korea, North Korea, Japan, Italy, Czechoslovakia, Mongolia, Australia, New Zealand etc. Member of the Board of Russian Association of Koreanologists, member of Dissertation Evaluation Committee at the Council of Studies of the Productive Forces of the Ministry of Economy of Russia and Russian Academy of Science.

Honors 
 1995 - Awarded personal diplomatic rank of Minister Extraordinary and Plenipotentiary 
 1997 - Awarded Honorary medal «850th Anniversary of Moscow»
 2001 - Awarded by the Decree of the President of Russia by Honorary medal "100 years of Transsib Railway"

Sources 

 Georgy Toloraya - Biography. Russian Association of Experts on Korea
 Georgy Toloraya - Biography. PIR-Center.
 Toloraya G. Publications. MGIMO University.

1956 births
Living people
Diplomats from Moscow
Moscow State Institute of International Relations alumni
Academic staff of the Moscow State Institute of International Relations